Siphonicytaridae is a family of bryozoans belonging to the order Cheilostomatida.

Genera:
 Siphonicytara Busk, 1884

References

Cheilostomatida